Statistics of League of Ireland in the 1967/1968 season.

Overview
It was contested by 12 teams, and Waterford won the championship.

Final classification

Results

Top scorers

League of Ireland seasons
Ireland
1967–68 in Republic of Ireland association football